The David Lean Cinema is a small cinema established in Croydon, London. It is accessed from the Croydon Clocktower arts complex on Katharine Street.

History
The cinema was established in the 1990s, to honour the director David Lean, who was born in the town. It was formed as a small, intimate, art house-style cinema to showcase the best of British film and World cinema as well as classic re-releases and recent favourites. It was established in a part of the 19th century Town Hall which had previously been used as a local studies library.

It closed as a result of council funding cuts in 2011, although films continued to be shown under the David Lean banner at the Fairfield Halls and the Spread Eagle pub. It then was reopened as a result of a local campaign in 2014.

References

External links
Save David Lean Cinema's website, providing programme listings
2016 David Lean Cinema new website

Cinemas in London
Buildings and structures in the London Borough of Croydon
1990s establishments in England
Culture in the London Borough of Croydon
Leisure in the London Borough of Croydon
David Lean